Nanda Lin Kyaw Chit (born 27 June 1991) is a Burmese professional footballer who plays as a midfielder for Chin United and Myanmar national team. He played for Myanmar U22 in 2013 AFC U-22 Asian Cup qualification. Nanda Lin Kyaw Chit won second runner-up of the 2013 MNL Best Player Award.

Club career
He played for Singapore club Balestier Khalsa in 2017 season. In 2018, he decided to join Thailand premier league-1 side PT Prachuap after his contract with S-league side expired.

In 2019, he signed on as a loan for Myanmar club Ayeyawady United for the 2019 season.

International goals
''Scores and results list Myanmar's goal tally first.

References

1991 births
Living people
Burmese footballers
Myanmar international footballers
Ayeyawady United F.C. players
Yadanarbon F.C. players
Balestier Khalsa FC players
PT Prachuap F.C. players
Association football forwards